The women's freestyle 63 kilograms is a competition featured at the 2002 World Wrestling Championships, and was held at the Tasos Kampouris Hall in Chalcis, Greece from 2 to 3 November 2002.

Results
Legend
F — Won by fall

Preliminary round

Pool 1

Pool 2

Pool 3

Pool 4

Pool 5

Pool 6

Pool 7

Knockout round

References

Women's freestyle 63 kg